John Salisbury may refer to:

John Salisbury (MP) for Leominster (UK Parliament constituency)
 John Salisbury (athlete) (born 1934), British athlete
 John Salisbury (bishop) (died 1573), Welsh clergyman
 John of Salisbury (c. 1120–1180), English author, educationalist, diplomat and bishop of Chartres

See also
 John Salusbury (disambiguation)